The September Concert is a charity which organises free public concerts on the anniversaries of 9/11. It was founded by Haruko Smith, following the events of that day in 2001.

History

Following the events of September 11th 2001, Haruko Smith had the idea to fill the skies of NYC with music, inspired by the words of Aldous Huxley:

The September Concert started out as a local grassroots charity and has grown to have a worldwide presence involving 10,000 volunteers and 15,000 musicians.

The September Concert Foundation was incorporated in April 2002 as a 501(c)(3) public charity, inspired a small army of volunteers, and on September 11th 2002 the first September Concert was born. To date this organization has functioned solely through the efforts of volunteers.

In addition to the board of directors that included artists Jacques d'Amboise and Robert Rauschenberg, The September Concert Foundation's advisory board was set up in 2002 with  entertainers such as Quincy Jones, Ravi Shankar and Christy Turlington Burns. Business leaders such as Tom Freston also joined in to help the foundation.

In 2010, 200 concerts were held all over the world on or near September 11. In New York City 58 concerts were held, joined by another 30 U.S. cities  and 45 international cities including Edinburgh London, Rome, Tamale (Ghana), Cap-Haïtien and Tokyo.

Mission and principles

The mission of the September Concert Foundation is to bring communities together, to reaffirm the hope for peace, and to celebrate our universal humanity.
 
The foundation accomplishes this by inviting musicians of every age and genre to bring their gift of music anywhere space is available on the days surrounding the anniversary of September 11. Concerts are held in parks, gardens, schools, libraries, churches, restaurants, cafes, galleries, office buildings, stores, senior centers, community centers.

There are three principles behind the September Concert:
Freedom for anyone to organise a concert with any genre and venue;
Equality between the different musicians and styles of music; and
Accessibility: all of the concerts are free

Media coverage

More news coverage of The September Concert

Video of September 2009 concerts around the world

Organisers

Board of Directors

Haruko Smith, Founder and chair, Taro Patrick Smith, Ph.D., Jacques d'Amboise, Robert Benezra, Ph.D., Milagros del Corral, Ph.D., John Daly Goodwin, Darryl Pottorf, Rebecca Seawright, Sundaram Tagore, Randy Wayne White

In memoriam

Robert Rauschenberg

Advisory board

Marisa Berenson, Christy Turlington Burns, John Campi, Tom Freston, Quincy Jones, Dorothy Lichtenstein, Milton Moskowitz, David Ng, Todd Oldham, Nancy Ploeger, Howard J. Rubenstein, Susan Rudin, William C. Rudin, Ravi Shankar, Steven Spinola, Scott M. Stringer, Dennis Swanson

International Committee

Camilla G. Hellman, Rosario Velasco Lino, Ludovica Rossi Purini, Mayo Shono, Koji Yoshikawa.

Notes

External links

WOR interview with Haruko Smith on the radio show Valerie's New York - 8/31/10 MP3 audio file (9.6 MB)
The September Concert page of Compagnia per la Music in Italy
The September Concert page from Japan (in Japanese)

Music of New York City
Memorials for the September 11 attacks
Organizations established in 2002
Recurring events established in 2002
September events
2002 establishments in the United States